1980s in Hong Kong marks a period when the territory was known for its wealth and trademark lifestyle. Hong Kong would be recognised internationally for its politics, entertainment and skyrocketing real estate prices.

Background

After being made a crown colony since 1843, the status of Hong Kong was changed effectively under the British Nationality Act 1981, which came into force on 1 January 1983. The Act renamed all existing British colonies to dependent territories. The renaming did not change how the government operated but it affected the nationality status of Hong Kong's then over 5 million inhabitants, most of whom were to become British Dependent Territory citizens – a status that could no longer be transmitted by descent.

Regardless of the competing claims for sovereignty, China's paramount leader Deng Xiaoping recognised that Hong Kong, with its free market economy, could not be assimilated into the People's Republic overnight and that any attempt to do so would not be in the interests of either. He advocated a more pragmatic approach known as the one country, two systems policy, in which Hong Kong (as well as Macau, and potentially also Taiwan) would be able to retain their economic systems within the PRC. On 19 December 1984, the Sino-British Joint Declaration on the Question of Hong Kong (The Joint Declaration) was signed between the PRC and UK governments. Under this agreement, Hong Kong would cease to be a British Dependent Territory on 1 July 1997 and would thenceforth be a Special Administrative Region (SAR) of the PRC. Citizens who were opposed to the handover and had the means to leave led to the first wave of emigration.

Demographics

Population
Hong Kong's population topped five million just at the beginning of the 1980s, and rose at an annual average rate of 1.3% over the next ten years. The additional 700,000 residents raised the population to 5.73 million at the end of the decade. The population of females rose 1.5% per annum, faster than that for males (1.4% p.a.), although females would remain a minority until 1996.

The decade also saw the first signs of population ageing, as the number of residents under the age of 25 fell by 1.2%. Households shrank in size from an average of 4.01 occupants in 1982 (the earliest available data) to 3.67 at decade's end. The 1980s were also characterised by the lowest population increase due to net migration (30.1%), as opposed to natural expansion.

Immigration and emigration
From 1978 to September 1980, nearly 23,000 illegal immigrants from Mainland China entered Hong Kong. The government abolished the "touch-base" policy on 23 October 1980. After this date, any illegal immigrants captured would be sent back to their originating countries immediately. There were public outcries in the early 1980s over decreasing wages due to the large influx of mainland immigrants raising supply against demand.

On the other hand, citizens of Hong Kong were beginning to emigrate to the UK, Canada and United States in large numbers due to the uncertainty of the handover in 1997. From 1980 to 1986, an estimated 21,000 people left Hong Kong permanently every year. Beginning in 1987, the numbers rose sharply to 48,000 people a year.

Culture

Education
In the early 1980s, Hong Kong's education system could only accommodate 2% of the youth who wanted to seek higher education. It was not until 1989 that the government decided to expand the programs domestically. Prior to this, it was expected that higher education should be gained abroad.

Two special institutes opened to train young athletes and performers, respectively. The Jubilee Sports Centre opened in 1982 while the Hong Kong Academy for Performing Arts was founded in 1984 to educate students of the performing arts, music, and related technical professions.

Entertainment
The mid-'80s saw the popularising of the Walkman. It was one of the key factors in contributing to the rise of the cantopop culture. Leslie Cheung, Anita Mui and Alan Tam were among the biggest pop stars. Other shows related to Super Sentai and Transformers were translated and broadcast regularly. The franchising of toy stores such as Toys "R" Us flooded the malls of Hong Kong. Japanese import stores like Sogo in Causeway Bay also made Hello Kitty a cultural icon.

The performing arts received a boost in the 1980s with the opening of numerous new Urban Council performance venues including the Tsuen Wan Town Hall (1980), Tuen Mun Town Hall (1987), Sha Tin Town Hall (1987), Hong Kong Cultural Centre (1989) and Sheung Wan Civic Centre (1989).

Cinema
Domestic movies in the late '80s would put Hong Kong cinema on the international map. Jackie Chan was recognised for his acrobatic displays and his stunt team. Chow Yun-fat was known for his TV drama performances. His collaboration with John Woo set the de facto standard for triad films in A Better Tomorrow.

Natural disasters
In the 1980s, there were 10 Typhoons which had a signal of number 8 and 1 Typhoon 10, The 3 worst typhoons were Typhoon Ellen, Typhoon Gordon and Typhoon Joe. The longest typhoon 8 was Severe Tropical Storm Lynn which had Typhoon 8 status for 28 hours and 45 Minutes.

Politics
In response to China's Tiananmen Square protests on 27 May 1989, over 300,000 people gathered at Victoria Park for a gathering called "Democratic songs dedicated for China". Many famous Hong Kong and Taiwan artists performed and expressed their support for the students in Beijing.

The massacre in Tiananmen Square on 4 June 1989 shocked the public. More than one million residents demonstrated to express their sorrow.

Economy

Manufacturing
In the early 1980s, younger Hong Kong workers began avoiding the manufacturing industry entirely. Hong Kong's on-going evolution away from manufacturing picked up steam during the decade, as production's share of the economy fell from 22.8% in 1980 to 16.7% ten years later. Replacing it was a greater reliance on services, which rose from 68.3% to 75.4% of GDP. The fastest growing sectors were foreign trade, logistics and communications and general personal and community services. The lack of investment in domestic industry, along with China's economic reform, began opening up manufacturing to the mainland. Middle-aged men and women who had spent decades in manufacturing were suddenly left with no place to go.

Real estate
In 1960, the University of Hong Kong and Hong Kong Technical College were one of the first schools to offer real estate education, but the curriculum was considered a sub program. In 1981, the University of Hong Kong became the first institution to be accredited by the RICS. It was the first step in connecting real estate education and the industry itself. By 1983, 61% of capital investments belonged to the real estate sector. The amount of money entering the communities for infrastructure expenses in the 1980s eclipsed the sum of all real estate investments from 1940 to 1979. An up-to-date understanding of the industry along with the high-density population provided many with the opportunity to capitalise on realty sales. Areas like Lan Kwai Fong were improving at the time and became an "alternative" or "open" avenue to attract people who wanted things to be different. If construction was not open before, many areas found themselves redeveloping.

Finance
The lack of foreign-exchange control, and low tax, contributed to the competitiveness of Hong Kong's economy. Though a floating rate, coupled with panic about intensified political talk of the handover, sent consumer confidence to an all-time low, causing Black Saturday in 1983. The end result was that Hong Kong adopted a linked exchange rate system. The exchange rate between the Hong Kong dollar and the :United States dollar was fixed at HKD $7.8 = US$1. The Hong Kong Monetary Authority's exchange fund was responsible for keeping the market rate stable. In the short period from just a decade previously, inflation would also increase from 5% in the 1970s to 12.7% by 1983.

Transport
The Modified Initial System, the first line of the Mass Transit Railway (MTR), was officially opened by Princess Alexandra in February 1980. Over the course of the 1980s the MTR expanded rapidly. An extension to Tsuen Wan opened in 1982, while the more technically challenging Island line opened in 1986. The new metro system was instantly successful at attracting heavy patronage.

In addition, the much older Kowloon–Canton Railway (KCR) was fully modernised in the early 1980s. It was double-tracked and electrified. New stations were built to serve growing new towns and new housing estates, while many several older stations were closed. The KCR also opened a new light rail network in 1988 to link the new towns of Yuen Long and Tuen Mun.

See also

References

 
British Hong Kong